Basilaki Island (Moresby Island) is an island in the Louisiade Archipelago in Milne Bay Province, Papua New Guinea. It is located at the eastern end of the New Guinea mainland.

History 
First recorded sighting by Europeans was by the Spanish expedition of Luís Vaez de Torres on 18 July 1606, that charted it as San Buenaventura (after Saint Bonaventure).

A party of French naturalists was believed to have been murdered in James Bay in October 1880.

This island was the scene of the murder of two sailors by natives in Hoopiron Bay, July 28, 1885. The men were Captain John Friar and John Watkins, a carpenter of Lallah Rook, a schooner registered in Saint John, New Brunswick. The vessel anchored in the bay to take on fresh water. After the murders, the crew sailed away.

The murders were revenge taken for two unpaid-for deaths of natives in Friar's employ. Later Diamond returned and burned all the villages nearby.

Three planes were ditched off the island in 1943, a P-38H Lightning, a P-38F Lightning, and a B-24D Liberator "The Leila Belle".

Administration 
The island is part of the following Wards:

 Hamama, on the western part.
 Buairi, which is on Buairi island, includes a small portion of the western part.
 Habani, on the south-central area.
 Gigia, on the north-central area. (with Bwanadalu island)
 Bedauna, on the southeast area (with Kitai islands)
 Yokowa, on the northeast area.

All Wards belong to Bwanabwana Rural Local Level Government Area LLG, Samarai-Murua District, which are in Milne Bay Province.

Geography 
Basilaki is located on the east of Samarai Islands of the Louisiade Archipelago. The island is part of the Basilaki group.
Mount Kova Sina (Fairfax) reaches a height of 531 meters, and is located at the center of the island. 
Mount Baiaule is 444 meters, and is located at the center of the island. 
Mount Salawie is 333 meters, and is located at the south of the island.

Demographics 
The population of 1883 is living in 37 villages across the island. Yokowa, where the school is located, is the largest village. although, the main dock is at Habani, at the other side of the island. 
List of villages: Hoopiron Bay, Gaiogaiokawasi, Baiaule, Hilomai, Habani, Halahalawuwu, Salewai, Wetoa, Dauyai, Hiliki, Towina, Kawalolo, Bedauna, Mwahui, Kalotau, Taladio, Agarauna, Huba, Yokowa, Dahidahina, Siu, Pihigole, Gigia, Doba, Tanubuibuina, Delina, Tutuila, Hewoli, Hamama, Duiauna, Nuanuatieu, Gogolabia, Hakalihi, Bogala, Kalamadau, Yahala.

Economy 
The islanders, are farmers as opposed to eastern Louisiade Archipelago islanders. they grow Sago, Taro, and Yams for crops.

Transportation 
There is a dock at Habani.

References 

 http://islands.unep.ch/IHD.htm#840

Islands of Milne Bay Province
Louisiade Archipelago